The Statist was a British magazine. It was established in 1878. From 1878 to 1894, its subtitle was "a weekly journal for economics and men of business"; from 1894 the subtitle was "an independent journal of finance and trade". From 1894 to 1900 the assistant editor was George Paish.

The magazine was relaunched in 1961 by IPC Magazines, with Paul Bareau as editor. It was intended as a rival to The Economist, and had a similar design. By 1967, Bareau was editor-in-chief.

The magazine was closed in 1967 with sales of 20,000-30,000 copies, with fewer than 200 issues.

References

External links
 WorldCat record

1878 establishments in the United Kingdom
1967 disestablishments in the United Kingdom
Business magazines published in the United Kingdom
Defunct magazines published in the United Kingdom
Magazines established in 1878
Magazines disestablished in 1967
Weekly magazines published in the United Kingdom